Peggy Siegal (born July 17, 1947) is an American entertainment publicist who advertises new film releases to an audience of media providers and critics. She owns the Peggy Siegal Company, based in Manhattan, which was described as one of the top 12 media marketing firms in 2018. Siegal was involved in a controversy which damaged her business when it was made known she had promoted Jeffrey Epstein.

Marketing strategy 
Connected with New York City's elite, Siegal organizes and hosts private events, including film screenings, to which she invites prominent guests to help the film's reception. Her services are in highest demand in the season before award nominations, in particular the Academy Awards. Her reputation in the industry has been attributed, by her and others, to carefully selecting the guests she invites to these events. According to Siegal, she keeps a list of 30,000 contacts divided by nationality, including filmmakers, artists, writers, and finance professionals.

Jeffrey Epstein controversy 
In July 2019, after the New York Times reported Siegal's business connection with Jeffrey Epstein, some of Siegal's clients, such as Netflix and FX, canceled their contracts as a result of the Epstein scandal and larger Me Too movement. In 2011 Siegel organized an event at Epstein's mansion whose guests included notable people such as Prince Andrew, George Stephanopoulos, Katie Couric, and Chelsea Handler.

References

American publicists
Living people
Place of birth missing (living people)
1947 births
Jeffrey Epstein